The 5th TCA Awards were presented by the Television Critics Association. The ceremony was held on July 21, 1989 at the Century Plaza Hotel in Los Angeles, California.

Winners and nominees

Multiple wins 
The following shows received multiple wins:

Multiple nominations 
The following shows received multiple nominations:

References

External links
Official website
1989 TCA Awards at IMDb.com

1989 television awards
1989 in American television
TCA Awards ceremonies